Kraton Sumenep is the residence of the regent (bupati) of Sumenep on the Indonesian island of Madura. 

It was built in the 18th century by Panembahan Sumolo, the son of Queen Raden Ayu Tirto-negoro and her spouse, Bendoro Saud who was a commoner descendant of Muslim scholars. The architect is thought to be the grandson of one of the first Chinese to settle in Sumenep after the massacre of Chinese in Batavia. Part of the building is a museum with a collection of royal possessions.

See also
Indonesian architecture
Kraton (Indonesia)
List of monarchs of Java
 List of palaces in Indonesia

References
 Schoppert, P., Damais, S., Java Style, 1997, Didier Millet, Paris, p. 207, 
 

Palaces in Indonesia
Royal residences in Indonesia
Madura Island
Buildings and structures in East Java